The 1932 Florida Gators football team represented the University of Florida during the 1932 college football season. The season was Charlie Bachman's fifth and last as the head coach of the Florida Gators football team. In the Gators' final year as members of the Southern Conference, they finished twentieth of twenty-three teams in the conference standings.

Before the season
Coach Bachman expected the Gators to win half of their games. The Florida squad was full of sophomores.

Schedule

Season summary

Sewanee
The Gators opened the season with their only conference victory, a 19–0 shutout of the struggling Sewanee Tigers. Hub McAnly ran a school record 91 yards for one score.

The Citadel

Source:

In the second week of play, Florida beat The Citadel in the rain 27–7.

NC State

Source:

In Tampa, the Gators lost to the NC State Wolfpack 17–6.  An Al Rogero touchdown made the score 7–6, but in the fourth quarter the Wolfpack put the game out of reach.

Georgia
There was little enthusiasm as Florida departed for Athens, battered by injuries and demotions due to rule infractions. Florida lost to the Georgia Bulldogs 12–33.

North Carolina
In Chapel Hill, the Gators were defeated by the Tar Heels 13–18. The Tar Heels' Johnny Daniel returned the opening kickoff 95 yards.

Auburn
SoCon champion Auburn defeated Florida 21–6. Jimmy Hitchcock was taken out of a game for the first time in his career.

Georgia Tech
Florida was the underdog going into the Georgia Tech game, losing 6–0.

Tennessee

Source:

Expected to be the hardest game since the beginning of the season, rival Tennessee beat Florida 13–32. Beattie Feathers scored after the opening kickoff.

UCLA

Notwithstanding the Gators' Depression-era struggles and 3–6 overall win–loss record, Bachman managed to end his tenure on a high note with a 12–2 intersectional upset of the UCLA Bruins in his final game.

Postseason
After the season, Bachman resigned, though left some idea he might still return to Florida. Bachman ultimately accepted an offer to become the head coach of the Michigan State Spartans, and he was later inducted into the College Football Hall of Fame as a coach in 1978.

References

Bibliography
 

Florida
Florida Gators football seasons
Florida Gators football